The second season of the American television drama series Mad Men premiered on July 27, 2008 and concluded on October 26, 2008. It consisted of thirteen episodes, each running approximately 48 minutes in length. AMC broadcast the second season on Sundays at 10:00 pm in the United States; it would occupy in this timeslot for the remainder of its run.

Season two takes place from February 14 to October 24, 1962, culminating with the Cuban Missile Crisis. It expands on Peggy's rise in the workplace and the marital strife between Don and Betty Draper as Don's infidelities further intrude on his family life. The second season also introduces an unknown acquaintance, with whom Don is corresponding by letter in secret. 

The second season of Mad Men was met with critical acclaim: it was honored with the Primetime Emmy Award for Outstanding Drama Series, the Golden Globe Award for Best Drama Series, and recognition by the American Film Institute, all for the second year in a row.

Cast

Main cast
 Jon Hamm as Don Draper
 Elisabeth Moss as Peggy Olson
 Vincent Kartheiser as Pete Campbell
 January Jones as Betty Draper
 Christina Hendricks as Joan Holloway
 Bryan Batt as Salvatore Romano
 Michael Gladis as Paul Kinsey
 Aaron Staton as Ken Cosgrove
 Rich Sommer as Harry Crane
 John Slattery as Roger Sterling

Recurring cast

Guest stars
 Alexa Alemanni as Allison
 Ryan Cutrona as Gene Hofstadt
 Joe O'Connor as Tom Vogel
 Elizabeth Rice as Margaret Sterling
 Maggie Siff as Rachel Menken
 Darby Stanchfield as Helen Bishop
 Marten Holden Weiner as Glen Bishop

Plot
Season two opens on Valentine's Day, 1962, fifteen months after the events of season one. The Draper marriage seems to be on sturdier footing, while Peggy has returned to work. Joan and Roger have ended their romance. Betty has taken up horseback riding as a hobby and rebuffs the constant flirtations of a male fellow rider, Arthur Case.

Sterling Cooper travels further into the "Pepsi Generation" as signing youth talent becomes a priority at the behest of "Duck" Phillips, Draper's choice as head of accounts from the previous year. Duck then convinces the firm to try and sign his old client, American Airlines, after the airline publicly announces a shift in marketing.  Draper protests, as pitching for the project requires the firm to drop Mohawk Airlines, one of Draper's main clients.  The American Airlines pitch fails, significantly harming Phillips' reputation at the firm and creating palpable tension with Draper.

Joan, having been outed to her coworkers by Paul as being 31 years old, hurriedly becomes engaged to egotistical and frustrated medical resident Greg Harris. Too proud to admit to his own insecurities regarding his career, Greg takes full advantage of being the only man Joan is willing to be submissive to; this culminates in him raping Joan inside Don's office prior to the couple's wedding. In spite of this, Joan remains with her fiancé.  

As fellow creative Freddy Rumsen devolves into alcoholism, Don has to step in to handle the obnoxious antics of his talent, comedian Jimmy Barrett, and ends up having an extramarital affair with Barrett's wife, Bobbie. Don's relationship with Bobbie is significantly more volatile than his past affairs. After Don discovers that Bobbie and other women around town have been discussing Don's sexual prowess, Don leaves her tied to a hotel bed in her lingerie. Later, a resentful Jimmy tells Betty about the affair, eventually causing her to kick Don out of the family home. 

Peggy, meanwhile, strikes up a courteous friendship with her priest, Father Gill. Peggy's sister tells Father Gill about Peggy's previous pregnancy during confession, which he subtly reveals to Peggy. Flashbacks to January 1961 reveal that Don was Peggy's only visitor at the hospital after her child was born. Don had convinced her to get out of the hospital and return to work, telling her, "This never happened. It will shock you how much it never happened." 

After a short affair, Roger proposes to Jane Siegel, Draper's secretary, and ends his marriage with Mona, causing personal and (with a looming divorce) financial pressures in the partnership.

Don takes a business trip to California during his exile from home. During this trip, he disappears, his whereabouts unknown both to his wife and children and his business associates, including Pete Campbell, whom he accompanied to California and whom he leaves at the hotel where they are staying. After spending a couple of days with a group of European tax exiles in Palm Springs, one of whom he beds, he ends up meeting with Anna Draper, the wife of the original Don Draper, whom he has set up in a bungalow in San Pedro. Anna comforts Don about his current marital troubles and identity crisis. Don returns home as the Cuban Missile Crisis begins.  

While Don is away, Roger bluntly informs Duck that a partnership is not forthcoming.  Duck then meets with executives from his former London firm, Putnam, Powell & Lowe, who refuse to hire him. Duck, in desperation, informs them of Sterling Cooper's vulnerable position and pitches a buyout, with Duck being appointed President. PPL then offers the buyout to Bert and Roger, through Duck.  Roger's looming divorce makes the sale especially enticing to him, and after discussions between Bert and his sister, who is revealed as a major partner in the firm, the buyout is accepted in Don's absence.  Duck informs Pete that he plans to either have Draper follow his lead or be sent out the door, using the non-compete clause in Don's contract as leverage.

In Don's absence, Peggy successfully brings in the Popsicle account and uses this as leverage to acquire Freddy Rumsen's old office. Pete is impressed by this maneuver and his romantic interests in Peggy are rekindled. Although married to Trudy, Pete professes his love for Peggy and tells her that he wishes he had married her instead. Peggy explains to Pete that she could have shamed him into marriage the year before. Pete doesn't understand what Peggy means, so Peggy finally confesses to Pete that he had gotten her pregnant and she had put their child up for adoption, a particularly galling development for Pete, since he and Trudy are so far unable to conceive. Pete also has a blue-blood abhorrence for adoption and now realizes his own blue-blood offspring is being raised by another family.

When Don returns, Pete informs Don of Duck's plans.  At the initial meeting with the lead SC and PPL executives, Draper informs them that he would not work under Duck's vision of the agency. After Duck directly challenges Don, Don informs him that he is not under any contract to the agency, to Duck's petulant surprise. Duck loses his temper, putting his promotion after the merger in question.

Betty learns from her doctor that she is expecting another child. After subtle questions about abortion, the doctor chides her to keep the child. Betty has sex with a stranger at a local bar. She returns home to find a letter from Don, begging her to let him come home. The season closes as Betty informs him of their new child. They hold hands in the kitchen.

Episodes

Production

Crew
Series creator Matthew Weiner also served as showrunner and executive producer, and is credited as a writer on 11 of the 13 episodes of the season. Lisa Albert was promoted to supervising producer and wrote two episodes. Writing team Andre Jacquemetton and Maria Jacquemetton were promoted to supervising producers and wrote three episodes. Robin Veith was promoted to staff writer and wrote three episodes. Kater Gordon was promoted to staff writer and co-wrote her first episode of the series. Joining the writing staff in the second season were consulting producers Rick Cleveland, Jane Anderson, and Marti Noxon, who each wrote an episode. Other producers were unit production manager Dwayne Shattuck, who was promoted to co-producer; Blake McCormick, who was promoted to producer; and Scott Hornbacher, who was promoted to co-executive producer.

Directors of multiple episodes for the season included Andrew Bernstein who directed three episodes, and Lesli Linka Glatter, Tim Hunter, and Phil Abraham, who each directed two. The remaining episodes were directed by Michael Uppendahl, script supervisor Jennifer Getzinger, who made her television directorial debut, and series creator Matthew Weiner, who directs each season finale.

Reception

Critical reception
The second season of Mad Men has received critical acclaim. Review aggregator Rotten Tomatoes reports that 100% of 26 critics have given the season a positive review. The site's consensus is: "The second season of Mad Men delves deeper into the personal lives of its characters without sacrificing the show's trademark droll humor and period atmosphere." On Metacritic, the second season scored 88 out of 100 based on 20 reviews, indicating universal acclaim.

Robert Bianco of USA Today wrote an extremely positive review, giving the second season four out of four stars and commenting that the series was at the "height of its powers" and "terrifically acted and gorgeously produced, this is a show that's both funny and frightening, that can simultaneously make you miss the '60s and feel blessed that they're gone." Bianco concluded, "if this is the future of TV, the future's looking good." The New York Times said Mad Men "is more than a period piece. It’s a sleek, hard-boiled drama with a soft, satirical core." TIME said the series was better than other sixties-set series because the "characters do not stand in for Important Social Milestones. The changes in society serve to illustrate the characters, not the other way around. Don is right. In the end, no one is nostalgic for fashions or fads or furniture. We're nostalgic for people. And that, for all its sexy Eames-era perfection, is what Mad Men gives us." 

The Pittsburgh Post-Gazette opined that the series was the "sophisticated heir" to The Sopranos and observed the historical authenticity of the series extends "to the characters, their reactions, their choices and the ways in which they relate to one another. It's a Mad Men hallmark that sets the show head and shoulders above its prime-time peers." Tim Goodman of the San Francisco Chronicle said the series "reaffirm[s] its place in the upper echelon of television dramas. The writing is a real thing of beauty - from the aforementioned nuance to searing workplace witticisms and pitch-perfect tone from a multitude of characters. You can't overstate how accomplished Mad Men is at understanding the vagaries of dialogue among disparate characters." Salon.com noted that the time period almost acts as an antagonist for the characters and that "what sets this drama apart from others is the complexity and depth of its themes beyond the obvious."

Accolades 
The second season of Mad Men was recognized with many award nominations and wins. At the 61st Primetime Emmy Awards, Mad Men won Outstanding Drama Series and Outstanding Writing in a Drama Series (Matthew Weiner and Kater Gordon for "Meditations in an Emergency"), both for the second year in a row. 

Jon Hamm was nominated for Outstanding Lead Actor in a Drama Series, while John Slattery was nominated for Outstanding Supporting Actor in a Drama Series, both for the second year in a row. Elisabeth Moss received an Emmy nomination for Outstanding Lead Actress in a Drama Series for the first time. The series also received three additional nominations for Outstanding Writing in a Drama Series (Robin Veith and Matthew Weiner for "A Night to Remember"; Andre Jacquemetton, Maria Jacquemetton and Matthew Weiner for "Six Month Leave"; and Matthew Weiner for "The Jet Set"). Phil Abraham received an Outstanding Directing for a Drama Series nomination for directing "The Jet Set". 

The series was recognized by the American Film Institute as one of the ten greatest television achievements for 2008. AFI commented that the series unveiled "a work of art each week" and that the series became more of an ensemble piece in the second season, though still anchored by Jon Hamm's performance as 'Don Draper'.

The series won Best Television Drama Series at the 66th Golden Globe Awards for the second year in a row. Jon Hamm and January Jones were also nominated for Best Actor – Television Series Drama and Best Actress – Television Series Drama, respectively. Season two was also honored at the 25th TCA Awards with the Outstanding Achievement in Drama award.

The series also won a Casting Society of America Artios Award for Outstanding Casting in a Television Series, Drama. The second season won Best Dramatic Series at the 2008 Writers Guild of America Awards. The cast of Mad Men won Outstanding Performance by an Ensemble in a Drama Series at the 15th Screen Actors Guild Awards, while Jon Hamm and Elisabeth Moss were nominated for Outstanding Performance by a Male Actor in a Drama Series and Outstanding Performance by a Female Actor in a Drama Series.

References

External links
 
 

2008 American television seasons
 
Television series set in 1962